Fromentin may refer to:

 Eligius Fromentin (circa 1767–1822), American politician
 Eugène Fromentin (1820–1876), French painter and writer
 Jacques Fromentin (1754–1830), French general of the French Revolutionary Wars
 Fromentin, Chlef, Algeria